is a Japanese professional basketball player for Osaka Evessa of the B.League in Japan. He played college basketball for Ashiya University. The Japanese Olympic Committee penalized Hashimoto for buying sex in Jakarta and sent him back home on August 20, 2018. He had been suspended from official competition for one year.

Career statistics

Regular season 

|-
| align="left" | 2012-13
| align="left" | Osaka
| 33 || 0 || 7.6 || 33.8 || 0.0 || 45.0 || 1.4 || 0.2 || 0.2 || 0.4 || 0.7 || 1.7
|-
| align="left" | 2016-17
| align="left" | Osaka
| ||  ||  ||  ||  ||  ||  ||  ||  ||  ||  || 
|-

References

1994 births
Living people
Japanese men's basketball players
Osaka Evessa players
Sportspeople from Osaka
Shooting guards
Basketball players at the 2018 Asian Games
Asian Games competitors for Japan